Kaili Lukan is a Canadian rugby sevens player. She made her debut with the senior national team in June 2017 during the Clermont-Ferrand, France leg of the HSBC World Rugby Women's Sevens Series. She won a gold medal at the 2019 Pan American Games as a member of the Canada women's national rugby sevens team. Lukan was named to the HSBC Sydney Series, Dream Team in February, 2020.   Lukan is known for her athleticism, speed and ball handling.  She is a crossover athlete who played NCAA Division I basketball at the University of Wisconsin-Green Bay (known for sporting purposes as Green Bay) from 2012–16
prior to joining Canada's national rugby sevens team.  Lukan scored 1,028 points and won various conference honors over her Green Bay basketball career, including 2016 Horizon League Defensive Player of the Year. Her older sister Megan Lukan also played basketball at Green Bay and was a member of the Canada women's national rugby sevens team that won a bronze medal during the 2016 Rio Olympics. She was born in Willemstad, Curaçao but spent her early years in Barrie, Ontario. Lukan has four siblings beside her sister Megan, including two other sisters and two brothers. She is openly lesbian.

Career
In June 2021, Lukan was named to Canada's 2020 Summer Olympics team.

Green Bay statistics 

Source

References

1994 births
Living people
Canada international rugby sevens players
Female rugby sevens players
Green Bay Phoenix women's basketball players
Rugby sevens players at the 2019 Pan American Games
Pan American Games gold medalists for Canada
Pan American Games medalists in rugby sevens
Sportspeople from Barrie
People from Willemstad
Medalists at the 2019 Pan American Games
Rugby sevens players at the 2020 Summer Olympics
Olympic rugby sevens players of Canada
Canadian LGBT sportspeople
Canada international women's rugby sevens players